ST8 alpha-N-acetyl-neuraminide alpha-2,8-sialyltransferase 6 is a protein that in humans is encoded by the ST8SIA6 gene.

Function

Sialic acid is a key determinate of oligosaccharide structures involved in cell-cell communication, cell-substrate interaction, adhesion, and protein targeting. ST8SIA6 belongs to a family of sialyltransferases (EC 2.4.99.8) that synthesize sialylglycoconjugates (Takashima et al., 2002 [PubMed 11980897]).

References

Further reading